Rustam Ilmirovich Temirgaliev is the Director General Russia-China Investment Fund for Regional Development since August 8, 2018.

Deputy Chairman of the Council of Ministers of the Autonomous Republic of Crimea. Doctor of public administration.

Biography
He was born on August 15, 1976 in Ulan-Ude, Russian SFSR. His father Ilmir Nasikhovich Temirgaliev moved to Crimea in 1983, after finishing his military service in the Group of Soviet Forces in Germany. In Crimea, Rustam Temirgaliev finished high school in the village of Perevalne. In 1998 Temirgaliev graduated from the Kyiv National Economic University. After studying he worked as a teacher of economic policy in the Crimean Institute of Economy and Administrative Law. In 2002-03 Temirgaliev worked for the State Innovation Company. In 2003-05 he was a member of the Crimean republican government and in 2003-04 he was a deputy chairman of the Committee on Affairs of Family and Youth.

In 2005-09 Temirgaliev continued his education in the National Academy of State Administration. In 2010 he was elected to the Supreme Council of Crimea on a party list of the Party of Regions.

Temirgaliev is a Volga Tatar and his father Ilmir Nasihovich has been the chairman of the Association of Volga Tatars in the Republic of Crimea and Ukraine. According to Mustafa Dzhemilev, Rustam Temirgaliev is an agent of the Russian GRU.

During the 2014 Crimea crisis he sided with Sergey Aksyonov and played a key role in the Russian annexation of Crimea.

Criminal proceedings

In Ukraine
On April 2, 2014 Rustam Temirgaliev was placed on the SBU wanted list for "actions aimed at violent change or overthrow the constitutional order or the seizure of state power" (Article 109, part 1, Criminal Code of Ukraine).

In Russia
In February 2015 the media reported about investigation against Temirgaliyev. But Temirgaliyev stated that he was only a witness and was not related to this story.

References

External links
 Biography. Kievnews.

1976 births
Living people
People from Ulan-Ude
People of the annexation of Crimea by the Russian Federation
Kyiv National Economic University alumni
Party of Regions politicians
United Russia politicians
21st-century Russian politicians
Volga Tatar people
Russian military personnel
Fugitives wanted by Ukraine
Russian individuals subject to European Union sanctions